Jumabozor is a village in eastern Uzbekistan. It is located in Bekabad District, Tashkent Region.

References

Populated places in Tashkent Region